In linguistics, differential object marking (DOM) is the phenomenon in which certain objects of verbs are marked to reflect various syntactic and semantic factors. One form of the more general phenomenon of differential argument marking, DOM is present in more than 300 languages. The term "differential object marking" was coined by Georg Bossong.

Overview 
In languages where DOM is active, direct objects are partitioned into two classes; in most such DOM languages, only the members of one of the classes receive a marker (the others being unmarked), but in some languages, like Finnish, objects of both classes are marked (with different endings). In non-DOM languages, by contrast, direct objects are uniformly marked in a single way. For instance, Quechua marks all direct objects with the direct-object ending -ta, whereas English has no overt markers on any direct objects.

A common basis for differentially marking direct objects is the notion of "prominence," which reflects two properties that can be understood along decreasing scales:
Animacy:  human > animate > inanimate
Definiteness (or specificity):  personal pronoun > proper name > definite NP > indefinite specific NP > non-specific NP
These same scales are also reflected in Silverstein’s person/animacy hierarchy. Besides animacy and definiteness, another property that triggers differential object marking in some languages is the way the action of a verb affects the direct object. Some languages mark for only one of these  properties (e.g., animacy), while others' markings reflect combinations of them. Typically, direct objects that are more prominent are more likely to be overtly case-marked.

Examples

Spanish 
A well-known DOM language is Spanish. In Spanish, direct objects that are both human and specific require a special marker (the preposition a "to"):

Pedro besó a Lucía. = Peter kissed Lucy. (Literally, "Peter kissed to Lucy")

Inanimate direct objects do not usually allow this marker, even if they are specific:

Pedro besó el retrato. = Peter kissed the picture.

Yet, some animate objects that are specific can optionally bear the marker:

Pedro vio (a) la gata. = Peter saw (to) the cat-FEM

Some dialectal variation has been attested regarding the use of DOM in different varieties of Spanish. Balasch finds that, while the linguistic factors conditioning the use of DOM remain the same in both Mérida (Venezuela) Spanish and Madrid Spanish, DOM appears much more often in Madrid data. Furthermore, Tippets and Schwenter find that a factor known as relative animacy  (the animacy of the direct object relative to that of the subject) is quite important in the implementation of DOM in varieties of Spanish such as Buenos Aires and Madrid Spanish.

Sakha 
In languages like Turkish, Kazakh language and Sakha, more "prominent" objects take an overt accusative marker while nonspecific ones do not. Lack of an overt case marker can restrict an object's distribution in the sentence. Those orders are permitted in Sakha if accusative case is overtly expressed:

Sakha
a. кини яблоко-ну сии-р-∅
a. kini yabloko-nu sii-r-∅
NOM apple-ACC eat
’She/he is eating the/a (particular) apple.’

b. яблоко-ну кини сии-р-∅
b. yabloko-nu kini sii-r-∅

c. кини сии-р-∅ яблоко-ну
c. kini sii-r-∅ yabloko-nu

d. кини яблоко-ну бүгүн сии-р-∅
d. kini yabloko-nu bügün sii-r-∅	
NOM apple-ACC today eat
‘She/he is eating the/a (particular) apple today.’

However, when the object is nonspecific, alternative ordering is not permitted:
Sakha
a. кини яблоко сии-р-∅
a. kini yabloko sii-r-∅
NOM apple eat
’She/he is eating some apple or other.’

b. яблоко кини сии-р-∅
b. yabloko kini sii-r-∅

c. кини сии-р-∅ яблоко
c. kini sii-r-∅ yabloko

d. кини яблоко бүгүн сии-р-∅
d. kini yabloko bügün sii-r-∅	
NOM apple today eat
‘She/he is eating some apple or other today.’

When the direct object is low on the definiteness scale, it must directly precede the verb, whereas alternative ordering is possible when the direct object is higher in prominence.

Other languages

Other examples of languages with differential object marking are Persian, Turkish, Copala Triqui, Khasi, Tamil, Malayalam, Hindi, Marathi, Kham, Hebrew and Amharic. A number of languages in Mozambique also show differential object marking.
In Turkish, the direct object can either have accusative case or have no (visible) case at all; when it has accusative case, it is interpreted as specific (e.g. one specific person), and otherwise it is interpreted as nonspecific (e.g. some person). Most modern Indo-Aryan languages like Hindi and Marathi also exhibit something similar, where direct objects must be explicitly marked as accusative in the case of definite or often animate participants. Due to the accusative and dative markers being identical for many Indo-Aryan languages, some analyses assert that the accusative case is always unmarked (like the nominative), and instead the dative markers are identical to those for differential object marking.

Other DOM languages include some Aromanian dialects, precisely those of Krania, in Thessaly, Greece; and in the western dialects of Ohrid, in North Macedonia. Romanian also has DOM through the marker , these two and Spanish being the only Romance languages with this linguistic feature.

In addition to spoken languages, DOM is also found in some sign languages. In German Sign Language, for example, animate direct objects receive an additional marker while inanimate direct objects do not.

References

Bibliography

Although the phenomenon has been known for a very long time, it was considered a minor quirk in a few languages until the 1980s, when Bossong presented evidence of DOM in more than 300 languages. Since then, it has become an important topic of research in grammatical theory. This is a selection of works that deal with the phenomenon:

 
 
 
 
 
 
 
 
 
 
 
 
 
 
 
 
 
 
 

Grammatical cases
Syntax